Baviaans Local Municipality was an administrative area in the Sarah Baartman District of the Eastern Cape in South Africa. After the municipal elections on 3 August 2016 it was merged into the larger Dr Beyers Naudé Local Municipality.

The municipality was named after the Baviaanskloof. The name is of Dutch origin and means "baboons ravine".

Main places
The 2001 census divided the municipality into the following main places:

Politics 
The municipal council consisted of seven members elected by mixed-member proportional representation. Four councillors were elected by first-past-the-post voting in four wards, while the remaining three were chosen from party lists so that the total number of party representatives was proportional to the number of votes received.

In the 2009 South African general election the Democratic Alliance won a plurality of 45.77% (2,290 votes), while the African National Congress received only 44.73% (2,238 vote). Other minor parties included COPE with 4.72% (236 votes) and the Independent Democrats with 2.12% (106 votes)

In the election of 18 May 2011 the Democratic Alliance (DA) won a majority of four seats on the council.
The following table shows the results of the election.

References

External links
 
 Official website

Former local municipalities of South Africa